Despite having the largest oil reserves in the world, Venezuela has experienced fuel shortages several times throughout its history due to both economic and political reasons. The general strike of 2002–2003 resulted in the stoppage of the oil industry, which caused fuel shortages domestically, and Nicolás Maduro's administration has experienced chronic gasoline shortages.

History

General strike of 2002–2003 

The general strike of 2002–2003, aimed at asking for Hugo Chávez's resignation, resulted in the stoppage of the oil industry, particularly state oil company Petróleos de Venezuela (PDVSA), which caused significant fuel shortages domestically.

Unlike the previous strikes, this oil strike included not only the PDVSA management but also substantial parts of its operational staff, including virtually all of its marine flotilla captains. Within days the company was paralyzed. Petroleum production soon fell to one-third normal; Venezuela had to begin importing oil; domestically, gasoline for cars became virtually unobtainable, with many filling stations closed and long queues at others. Many privately owned businesses closed or went on short time, some out of sympathy for the strike, others because of the fuel shortage and economic paralysis. As long waits for gasoline became common, airlines cancelled many domestic flights, banks limited their opening hours, and many shops were shut despite it being peak Christmas shopping season.

By the time of the 11th anniversary of the 4 February 1992 coup attempt, the strike was virtually over outside the oil industry. The government gradually reestablished control over PDVSA; oil production reached pre-strike levels by April 2003.

Crisis in Venezuela 

After the death of Hugo Chávez and during Nicolás Maduro's administration, by 2014, gasoline started being rationed allegedly because subsidized Venezuelan gasoline was being smuggled to Colombia, where it was sold for a higher price. In March 2017, despite having the largest oil reserves in the world, some regions of Venezuela began having shortages of gasoline with reports that fuel imports had begun. By early 2018, gasoline shortages began to spread, with hundreds of drivers in some regions waiting in lines to fill their tanks, sleeping overnight in their vehicles during the process.

According to the OPEC, while in 2013 2.6 million oil barrels were processed in Venezuela daily, the production fell to only 1.1 million daily barrels in November 2018, half of  the production in 2013. Most of these exports were destined to external debts payments; according to economist Ramón Key, the situation directly affects state finances, which does not have enough cash flow to recover the production, to meet its obligations and to invest in the industry maintenance. The decrease of oil production also causes the collapse of refineries: in 2018, of a capacity of 1.6 million daily barrels, the facilities only produced 20% of their capacity.

Caracas' fuel supply is processed in the Paraguaná Refinery Complex, Falcón state, and later transported in boats to the Carenero distribution plant, Miranda state. Once stored, the fuel is sent through a poliducto to a distribution plant in Guatire, which is finally distributed to gas stations in Caracas.

However, in late 2018, two explosions were reported in the Guatire plant. Gas station employees interviewed by Efecto Cocuyo affirmed that the supply shortages are caused by fires in the Guatire facilities, and in response tank trucks are redirected from the Anzoátegui and Carabobo states. Each gas station needs at least a daily charge to have enough fuel to operate, but some trucks do not arrive with said frequency.

In early 2021, two tankers with gasoil and fuel set off from El Palito refinery to Cuba.

See also 
 Crisis in Venezuela
 Economy of Venezuela
 Shortages in Venezuela

References 

Crisis in Venezuela
2002 in Venezuela
2010s in Venezuela
2003 in Venezuela
Petroleum in Venezuela